Xianxia, directly translated to "immortal heroes" or "saint heroes", is a genre of Chinese fantasy heavily inspired by Chinese mythology and influenced by philosophies of Taoism, Chan Buddhism, Chinese martial arts, traditional Chinese medicine, Chinese folk religion, Chinese alchemy and other traditional elements of Chinese culture.

Etymology 

The characters forming xianxia are xiān (仙) and xiá (侠). A xiān is a concept from Chinese mythology, particularly of Taoist legends, that describes someone who has obtained immortality or extraordinary longevity through self-cultivation and become a kind of transcendent being. Xiá is usually translated as "hero" or "vigilante", but specifically implies a person who is brave, chivalrous, righteous and defiant.

Characteristics
The stories usually involve around the adventure/growth of a magical practitioner or a mortal person who happens to get entangled into supernatural affairs, and include elements such as gods and immortals, spirits, monsters, ghosts and mythical creatures.

Cultivation 
The xianxia genre also includes the popular subgenre known as "cultivation" or "training". In the 21st century, this subgenre became popular with the advent of online publishing, with sites such as Qidian.com, Zongheng.com, and 17k.com giving a platform for authors to reach wide audiences with high-volume, serialized content. It was popularized outside of China primarily by fan translations in the early 2000s. Novels such as Stellar Transformations, Coiling Dragon, Martial God Asura, and I Shall Seal the Heavens led to a boom in such fan translations. This genre is also a staple of Chinese television shows, films, manhua (comics), donghua (animation), and games.

In these stories protagonists are usually "cultivators" or "practitioners" (or ) who seek to become immortal beings called xian. Along the way, they attain eternal life, supernatural powers, and incredible levels of strength. The fictional theme of cultivation or immortal arts practice in xianxia is heavily based on the real-life meditation practice of qigong.

In Chinese web novels, xianxia, which often contain action themes, is one of the biggest genres and is mostly liked by male readers.

History 
There are many ancient Chinese texts that could be classified as xianxia, such as the Classic of Mountains and Seas from the Warring States period, or the Legend of the White Snake. Xianxia novels were popularized during the Republic of China period, but it was the 1932 novel Legend of the Swordsmen of the Mountains of Shu that sparked the modern popularity of the genre.

Films and television 
Perhaps one of the earliest successful xianxia films was the 1983 Hong Kong film Zu Warriors from the Magic Mountain, which was followed up by the 2001 film The Legend of Zu. Other film adaptations of novels have been well received, such as the 2017 romantic xianxia film Once Upon a Time and the 2019 Jade Dynasty.

Overall, television shows are more numerous than films when it comes to xianxia adaptations.

Some of the most popular and successful Chinese TV series in recent times are of the xianxia genre, such as Ashes of Love, Eternal Love, The Journey of Flower, The Untamed and Love Between Fairy and Devil. It is worth noting all four dramas are adapted from popular novels published on the website Jinjiang Literature City (晋江文学城). In addition, there are Swords of Legends, Noble Aspirations, Love of Thousand Years, Love and Redemption and other films and TV series. The already existing fandom of xianxia, and other fantasy novels has led to most new television and film titles to be adaptions and their warm reception by fans, along with increased exposure and high rates of anticipation.

Relationship with other genres 
Xianxia is often compared to the wuxia (武侠, "martial hero") genre, and the two share many similarities — both being set in a quasi-historical ancient China, featuring larger-than-life human protagonists, struggles between good and evil, and so on. The main difference is that xianxia generally has a more heavenly, transcendantal, or metaphysical atmosphere with a heavier focus on spiritual growth and mastery of super powers, pursuit for eternal existence, fates and reincarnations, multiple realms of reality, and interaction with supernatural beings and spirits; while wuxia is grounded in the human world with few supernatural elements and mainly emphasizes on martial arts, personal vendetta, treasure hunting, social justice and power struggles.  Crude approximations to the counterparts in Western literature might be that wuxia is loosely similar to the chivalric romance or American Western genre, where vigilantes, feuding factions/gangs and projectile/sword duels are common; while xianxia is closer to European high fantasy and sword and sorcery works in tone, except with a vaguely Ancient/Imperial China setting.

Xianxia is also different to the shenmo（神魔, "god [and] demon"）genre, which is high fantasy works predominantly focusing on deities, demons and supernatural beings with very little emphasis on mortal humans, while xianxia is more focused on humans who have supernatural encounters.

Other variants of similar Chinese high fantasy exist as well; xuanhuan (玄幻, "mysterious fantasy") generally refers to high-magic fantasy works that dispense with Taoist elements and have a less realistic setting; and qihuan (奇幻, "strange fantasy" or "exotic fantasy") are Chinese works set in a more explicitly Western-style fantasy setting, although generally keeping a Chinese mythological influence.

Influences 
As xianxia novels have become more popular worldwide, other genres have been influenced by it, such as Progression Fantasy and LitRPG, including authors such as Will Wight.

In popular culture

Film and television

Video games 
 Xuan Yuan Sword (轩辕剑) series
 The Legend of Sword and Fairy (仙剑奇侠传) series
 GuJian (古剑奇谭) series

See also
Xian (Taoism)
Chinese philosophy
Chinese mythology

References

Chinese fantasy
Chinese literary genres
Fantasy genres